Robert McTavish (26 October 1888 – 1972) was a Scottish professional footballer who played in the Scottish League for Third Lanark, Falkirk and Raith Rovers as an inside left. He also played in England for Brentford and Tottenham Hotspur.

Personal life 
McTavish's brother Jock was also a footballer and a forward; they were teammates at Falkirk and Tottenham Hotspur. His son John played as a defender, principally for Manchester City.

Career statistics

Honours 
Falkirk
 Stirlingshire Cup: 1909–10
 Stirlingshire Consolation Cup: 1907–08
 Dewar Shield: 1907–08

References 

Scottish footballers
English Football League players
Falkirk F.C. players
Tottenham Hotspur F.C. players
Brentford F.C. players
Third Lanark A.C. players
1888 births
1972 deaths
Petershill F.C. players
Association football inside forwards
Footballers from Glasgow
York City F.C. wartime guest players
Raith Rovers F.C. wartime guest players
Southern Football League players
Scottish Junior Football Association players